Alyxia squamulosa, commonly known as alyxia vine, is a species of shrub in the family Apocynaceae. It is endemic to Australia’s subtropical Lord Howe Island in the Tasman Sea. The specific epithet derives from the many bracteoles, or ‘scales’ (Latin: squamae, with the diminutive suffix -ulus) that subtend the flowers. The plant previously known as Alyxia lindii is considered a taxonomic synonym of A. squamulosa, being reassigned in 2002.

Description
The plant has a tendency to climb. Its leaves grow in whorls of five and are 2–5 cm long, 1.5–2.5 cm wide. The fetid white flowers are about 7 mm long, clustered in dense, rounded, terminal inflorescences 2–4 cm in diameter. The fruits are drupaceous, blue-black and about 2 cm long.

Distribution and habitat
The plant is found only on Lord Howe Island, on the lower hills of the island, as well as the higher southern peaks.

References

squamulosa
Endemic flora of Lord Howe Island
Gentianales of Australia
Plants described in 1873
Taxa named by Ferdinand von Mueller
Taxa named by Charles Moore